The 11th Annual Latin Grammy Awards were held on Thursday, November 11, 2010, at the Mandalay Bay Events Center in Las Vegas, Nevada. It was the third time the annual event had taken place at this location. The eligibility period for recordings to be nominated was July 1, 2009 to June 30, 2010. Nominations were announced on September 8, 2010. On September 14, 2010 it was announced that the Latin Recording Academy Person of the Year honoree would be Plácido Domingo. The big winners of the night were Camila, Juan Luis Guerra and Gustavo Cerati with three awards.

Juan Luis Guerra's A Son de Guerra was awarded the Album of the Year, the second time he has received this award. "Mientes" by pop band Camila won the Record of the Year and Song of the Year. Alex Cuba and Nelly Furtado became the first Canadian musicians to receive a Latin Grammy Award. Cuba received a Latin Grammy Award for Best New Artist and Furtado the Best Female Pop Vocal Album.

Awards
Winners are in bold text.

General
Record of the Year
Camila — "Mientes"
 Maria Bethânia — "Tua"
Concha Buika — "Se Me Hizo Fácil"
 Jorge Drexler — "Una Canción Me Trajo Hasta Aquí"
 Alejandro Sanz — "Desde Cuándo"

Album of the Year
Juan Luis Guerra 440 — A Son de Guerra
 Bebe — Y.
 Miguel Bosé — Cardio
Camila — Dejarte de Amar
 Alejandro Sanz — Paraíso Express

Song of the Year
Mario Domm and Mónica Vélez — "Mientes" (Camila)
 Descemer Bueno and Enrique Iglesias — "Cuando Me Enamoro" (Enrique Iglesias featuring Juan Luis Guerra)
 Alejandro Sanz and Tomas Torres — "Desde Cuándo" (Alejandro Sanz)
 Rubén Blades — "Las Calles"
 Jorge Drexler — "Una Canción Me Trajo Hasta Aquí" (Jorge Drexler)

Best New Artist
Alex Cuba
 Estrella
 Koko
 Jotdog
 Maria Gadú

Pop
Best Female Pop Vocal Album
Nelly Furtado — Mi Plan
 Bebe — Y.
 Estrella — Black Flamenco
 Kany García — Boleto De Entrada
 Rosario — Cuéntame

Best Male Pop Vocal Album
Alejandro Sanz — Paraíso Express
 Marc Anthony — Iconos
 Alex Cuba — Alex Cuba
 Joaquín Sabina — Vinagre y Rosas
 Aleks Syntek — Métodos de Placer Instantáneo

Best Pop Album by a Duo/Group with Vocals
Camila — Dejarte de Amar
 Estopa — X-Anniversarium
 Jotdog — Jotdog
 Los Claxons — Los Claxons
 Taxi — Aquí y Ahora

Urban
Best Urban Music Album
Chino & Nacho — Mi Niña Bonita
 Cartel de Santa — Sincopa
 Daddy Yankee — Daddy Yankee Mundial
 La Mala Rodríguez — Dirty Bailarina
 Vico C — Babilla

Best Urban Song
La Mala Rodríguez — "No Pidas Perdón"
 Daddy Yankee — "Descontrol"
 MC Babo, Mauricio Garza and R. Rodríguez — "El Hornazo" (Cartel de Santa)
 Daddy Yankee — "Grito Mundial" 
 Everton Bonner, Don Omar, Sly Dunbar, Eliel and Lloyd Willis — "Hasta Abajo" (Don Omar)
 Vico C — "Sentimiento" (Vico C featuring Arcángel)

Rock
Best Rock Album
Gustavo Cerati — Fuerza natural
 Bohemia Suburbana — Bohemia Suburbana
 Andrés Calamaro — On the Rock
 Chetes — Hipnosis
  — Si No Nos Mata

Best Rock Song
Gustavo Cerati — "Deja Vu"
 Chetes — "Arena"
 Sebastián Franco, Jesús Herrera, Amauri Sepúlveda, Diego Suárez and Marcos Zavala — "Cárcel" (Bengala)
 Bruno Albano Naughton, Luis G. Balcarce, Guido Colzani, Daniel Melero, Tomas Putruele, Diego "Uma" Rodriguez, Tuta Torres and Patricio Troncos — "Lo Comandas" (Banda de Turistas)
 Andrés Calamaro — "Los Divinos"

Alternative
Best Alternative Music Album
Ely Guerra — Hombre Invisible
 Banda de Turistas — Magical Radiophonic Heart
 Bengala — Oro
 El Cuarteto de Nos — Bipolar
 Perrozompopo — CPC (Canciones Populares Contestatarias)

Best Alternative Song
ChocQuibTown — "De Donde Vengo Yo"
 Hello Seahorse! — "Criminal" 
 Ceci Bastida — "Cuando Vuelvas a Caer"
 Roberto Musso — "El Hijo de Hernandez" (El Cuarteto de Nos)
 Gustavo Cortes, Ricardo Cortes and Nicolas Gonzalez — "Resistencia Indigena" (Sig Ragga)

Tropical
Best Salsa Album
Gilberto Santa Rosa — Irrepetible
 Huey Dunbar — Huey Dunbar IV
 Orquesta Guayacán — Bueno y Más
 La India — Unica
 Mario Ortiz All Star Band  — Tributo 45 Aniversario

Best Cumbia/Vallenato Album
Diomedes Diaz and Alvaro Lopez — Listo Pa' la foto
 El Binomio de Oro de America — Vuelve y pica...El Pollo
 Omar Geles and Alex Manga — Prueba Superada
 Jorge Oñate — Te Dedico Mis Triunfos
 Poncho Zuleta and Cocha Molina — El Nobel del Amor

Best Contemporary Tropical Album
Juan Luis Guerra 440 — A Son de Guerra
 Lucrecia — Album de Cuba
 Prince Royce — Prince Royce
 Tecupae — Tiempo
 Johnny Ventura — Volvio La Navidad

Best Traditional Tropical Album
Concha Buika — El Último Trago
 Pedro Jesus — Tributo a Orlando Contreras "El Jefe del Despecho"
 Septeto Habanero — 90 Años, Orgullos de Los Soneros
 Sierra Maestra — Sonando Ya
 Various Artists — 100 Sones Cubanos Producer Edesio Alejandro

Best Tropical Song
Juan Luis Guerra — "Bachata en Fukuoka"
 Fonseca and Willie Colón — "Estar Lejos" (Fonseca)
 Jorge L. Chacin and Fernando Osorio — "Sueño Contigo" (Tecupae featuring Cabas )
 Huey Dunbar and Jorge Luis Piloto — "Te Amaré" (Huey Dunbar)
 Tito El Bambino — "Te Pido Perdón"

Singer-Songwriter
Best Singer-Songwriter Album
Rubén Blades — Cantares del Subdesarrollo
 Santiago Cruz — Cruce de Caminos
 Jorge Drexler — Amar la Trama
 Maria Gadú — Maria Gadú
 Pavel Núñez — El Tiempo del Viento
 Silvio Rodríguez — Segunda Cita

Regional Mexican
Best Ranchero Album
Vicente Fernández — Necesito de Tí
 Alejandro Fernández — Dos Mundos
 Pedro Fernández — Amarte a la Antigua
 Juan Gabriel — Juan Gabriel
 Jenni Rivera — La Gran Señora

Best Banda Album
Banda el Recodo — Me Gusta Todo de Tí
 La Original Banda El Limón de Salvador Lizarraga — Soy Tu Maestro
 Banda Los Recoditos — ¡Ando Bien Pedo!
 El Chapo de Sinaloa — Con La Fuerza del Corrido
 K-Paz de la Sierra — Con Banda

Best Tejano Album
Elida Reyna & Avante — Fantasia
 Little Joe & La Familia — A Night Of Classics In El Chuco
 Joe Posada — Point Of View
 Ruben Ramos & The Mexican Revolution — Revolutionized
 Sunny Sauceda y Todo Eso — Homenaje a Mi Padre

Best Norteño Album
Grupo Pesado — Desde La Cantina Vol. 1.
 Duelo — Solamente Tú
 Intocable — Classic
 Los Tigres del Norte — La Granja
 Los Tucanes de Tijuana — Retro-Corridos

Best Regional Mexican Song
Yoel Henriquez and Paco Lugo — "Amarte a La Antigua" (Pedro Fernández)
 Freddie Martinez — "Atrapada En Un Amor" (Elida Reyna y Avante)
 Pepe Aguilar — "Chaparrita" (Songwriter: Pepe Aguilar)
 Joan Sebastian — "Estuve" (Alejandro Fernández)
 Josué Contreras and Johnny Lee Rosas — "No Puedo Volver" (Intocable)

Instrumental
Best Instrumental Album
Arturo Sandoval — A Time for Love
 Yamandu Costa and Hamilton de Holanda — Luz da Aurora
 Arthur Maia — O Tempo e a Musica
 Paulo Moura and Armandinho — Afrobossanova
 Soto 75 — Latin American Chillout

Traditional
Best Folk Album
Ilan Chester — Tesoros de la Música Venezolana
 Checo Acosta — El Folclor de Mi Tierra
 Eva Ayllón — Canta a Chabuca Granda
 Petrona Martínez — Las Penas Alegres
 Juan Fernando Velasco — Con Toda el Alma

Best Tango Album
Aida Cuevas — De Corazón a Corazón Mariachi Tango
 Pablo Aslan — Tango Grill
 Dyango — Puñaladas en el Alma
 Leopoldo Federico y Hugo Rivas — Sentido Único
 Narcotango — Limanueva
 Vayo — Tango Universal

Best Flamenco Album
Tomatito — Sonata Suite
 Juan Carmona — El Sentido del Aire
 José Mercé — Ruido
 Enrique Morente — Morente Flamenco en Directo
 Niño Josele — Española

Jazz
Best Latin Jazz Album
João Donato Trio — Sambolero
 Issac Delgado — L-O-V-E
 Mark Levine and The Latin Tinge — Off and On: The Music of Moacir Santos
 Poncho Sanchez — Psychedelic Blues
 Chucho Valdés — Cuban Dreams
 Miguel Zenón — Esta Plena

Christian
Best Christian Album (Spanish Language)
Monica — Tienes Que Creer
 Alex Campos — Te Puedo Sentir
 Danilo Montero — Devoción
 Rojo — Apasionado Por Tí
 Jesus Adrian Romero — El Brillo de Mis Ojos
 Álvaro Torres — Muy Personal

Best Christian Album (Portuguese Language)
 Marina de Oliveira — Na Extremidade
 Paulo César Baruk — Multiforme
 Bruna Krla — Advogado Fiel
 Kleber Lucas — Meu Alvo
 Soraya Moraes — Grande É O Meu Deus
 Rosa de Saron — Horizonte Distante
 Pe. Zezinho, Scj — Ao País dos Meus Sonhos

Brazilian
Best Brazilian Contemporary Pop Album
Sérgio Mendes — Bom Tempo
 CéU — Vagarosa
 Sandra de Sá — AfricaNatividade - Cheiro de Brasil
 Claudia Leitte — As Máscaras
 Michael Sullivan — Ao Vivo: Na Linha do Tempo Vol. 1

Best Brazilian Rock Album
Charlie Brown Jr. — Camisa 10 Joga Bola Até na Chuva
 Capital Inicial — Das Kapital
 Andreas Kisser — Hubris I & II
 Nasi — Vivo na Cena
 NX Zero — Sete Chaves

Best Samba/Pagode Album
Diogo Nogueira — Tô Fazendo a Minha Parte
 Alcione — Acesa
 Martinho da Vila — Poeta da Cidade: Martinho Canta Noel
 Grupo Revelação — Ao Vivo no Morro
 Monobloco — Monobloco 10
 Zeca Pagodinho — MTV Especial Zeca Pagodinho Uma Prova de Amor ao Vivo

Best MPB Album
Gilberto Gil — Banda Dois
 João Bosco — Não Vou Pro Céu, Mas Já Não Vivo no Chão
 Dori Caymmi — Inner World
 Toninho Horta — Harmonia & Vozes
 Joyce — Slow Music
 Jorge Vercillo — D.N.A.

Best Sertaneja Music Album
Zezé Di Camargo & Luciano — Double Face
 João Bosco and Vinicius — Coração Apaixonou - Ao Vivo
 Chitãozinho & Xororó — Se For Pra Ser Feliz
 Leonardo — Esse Alguém Sou Eu
 César Menotti & Fabiano — Retrato: Ao Vivo no Estúdio
 Luan Santana — Ao Vivo
 Victor & Leo — Ao Vivo e em Cores em São Paulo

Best Native Brazilian Roots Album
Gilberto Gil — Fé na Festa
 Frank Aguiar — Danquele Jeito
 Banda Calypso — 10 Anos CD 2
 Gaúcho da Fronteira — Gaúcho Doble Chapa
 Eva — Lugar da Alegria

Best Brazilian Song
Adriana Calcanhotto — "Tua" (Maria Bethânia)
 Jorge Vercillo — "Há de Ser"
 Sérgio Santos — "Litoral e Interior" 
 Dori Caymmi and Paulo César Pinheiro — "Quebra-Mar" (Dori Caymmi)
 Edu Lobo and Paulo César Pinheiro — "Tantas Marés" (Edu Lobo)

Children's
Best Latin Children's Album
Luis Pescetti — Luis Pescetti
 Banda de Boca — MPB Pras Crianças
 Rita Rosa — Insectos y Bicharracos
 Various Artists — Brasileirinhos
 Various Artists — Lo Mejor De Playhouse Disney

Classical
Best Classical Album
Leo Brouwer — Integral Cuartetos De Cuerda
Fernando Otero — Vital
 Yalil Guerra — Old Havana. Chamber Music Vol. I
 Miguel del Águila — Salón Buenos Aires
 John Neschling and Orquestra Sinfônica do Estado de São Paulo — Tchaikovsky - Manfred
 Southwest Chamber Music and Tambuco Percussion Ensemble — William Kraft: Encounters

Best Classical Contemporary Composition
Lalo Schifrin — "Pampas" (Antonio Lysy)
 Miguel del Águila — "Clocks" (Miguel del Águila)
 Sergio Assad — "Interchange-For Guitar Quartet and Orchestra" (Los Angeles Guitar Quartet, David Amado and The Delaware Symphony Orchestra)
 Sergio Assad — "Maracaípe" (Beijing Guitar Duo)
 Orlando Jacinto Garcia — "Silencios Imaginados" (Nodus Ensemble)
 Tania Leon — "To and Fro (4 Moods)" (Nodus Ensemble)

Recording Package
Best Recording Package
Rock Instrument Bureau — Fuerza natural (Gustavo Cerati)
 Luis Itanare — Casa 4 (Famasloop)
 Boa Mistura — En El Fin del Mundo (Chambao)
 Pico Covarrubias — Hombre Invisible (Ely Guerra)
 Locktite — Work In Progress (Erizonte)

Production
Best Engineered Album
Paul Acedo, Rafa Arcaute, Sebastian Krys, Lee Levin, Daniel Ovie, Sebastian Perkal, Tom Russo, Esteban Varela, Dan, Warner and Lurssen Inc. — Distinto (Diego Torres)
 Gregg Field, Don Murray and Michael Bishop — A Time for Love (Arturo Sandoval)
 José Amosa, Fran Ibáñez, Antonio Ruiz and Eduardo Ruiz — Ruido (José Mercé)
 Moogie Canazio, Gabriel Pinheiro and Luiz Tornaghi — Tua (Maria Bethânia)
 Jose Luis Crespo, Raul Quilez and Ian Cooper — Y. (Bebe)

Producer of the Year
Jorge Calandrelli and Gregg Field
Sergio George
 Rafael Arcaute and Diego Torres
 Noel Pastor
 Julio Reyes Copello

Music Video
Best Short Form Music Video
Julieta Venegas — "Bien o Mal"
 Ádammo — "Algún Día"
 El Cuarteto de Nos — "El Hijo de Hernandez"
 Juan Luis Guerra 440 — "Bachata en Fukuoka"
 Joaquín Sabina — "Viudita de Clicquot"

Best Long Form Music Video
Voz Veis — Una Noche Común y Sin Corriente
 Jorge Drexler — La Trama Circular
 León Gieco — Mundo Alas
 Laura Pausini — Laura Live World Tour 09
 Thalía — Primera Fila

Special Awards
Lifetime Achievement Awards
 João Donato
 Armando Manzanero
 Las Hermanas Márquez
 Joseíto Mateo
 Jorge Oñate
 Susana Rinaldi
 Ryfns

Trustees Awards
 Manuel Bonilla
 Juan Carlos Calderón
 Hebe Camargo

Performers
 Intro — "Latin Grammy 2010" 02:00
 Juan Luis Guerra featuring Chris Botti — "La Guagua / Lola's Mambo" 04:19
 Pedro Fernández — "Amarte A La Antigua / Celosa" 03:44
 Enrique Iglesias featuring Wisin & Yandel — "No Me Digas Que No / I Like It" 05:19
 Prince Royce and Ben E. King — "Stand By Me" 03:14
 Jenni Rivera — "Por Que No Le Calas / Ya Lo Sé" 03:29
 Marc Anthony featuring José Luis Perales — "Y Cómo Es El / Tú Amor Me Hace Bien" 08:14
 Banda El Recodo — "Dime Que Me Quieres" 03:06
 Nelly Furtado featuring La Mala Rodríguez — "Fuerte / Bajo Otra Luz (Rebirth Demolition Mix)" 03:42
 Camila — "Bésame" 04:12
 Rosario — "Cuéntame" 03:54
 Alejandro Fernández — "Vamos A Darnos Tiempo / Júrame" 05:16
 Ricky Martin and Natalia Jiménez — "Lo Mejor De Mi Vida Eres Tú" 03:34
 Grupo Pesado — "Cielo Azul, Cielo Nublado"
 Aleks Syntek — "Loca"
 Aida Cuevas — "Volver"
 ChocQuibTown — "Somos Pacíficos"
 Chino & Nacho — "Niña Bonita / Lo Que No Sabes Tú"
 Gilberto Santa Rosa and Johnny Ventura — "Hay Que Dejarse De Vaina" 04:56

Presenters
 Ximena Navarrete and Pepe Aguilar — presented Best Pop Vocal Album, Male
 Itatí Cantoral and Tommy Torres — presented Best Urban Music Album
 Jaime Camil and Claudia Leitte — presented Best Pop Vocal Album, Duo or Group
 Alejandro Sanz — presented Best New Artist
 Ricky Martin — presented People of the Year
 Vico C and Kany García — presented Record of the Year
 Gabriela Spanic and Jorge Drexler — presented Best Contemporary Tropical Album
 Cristián de la Fuente and Charo — presented Best Regional Mexican Song
 Maria Gadú, Tito El Bambino and Angélica Vale — presented Song of the Year
 Kuno Becker, Alexa Vega and Camilla Belle — presented Best Pop Vocal Album, Female
 La Mala Rodríguez and Alex Cuba — presented Best Ranchero Album
 Juan Fernando Velasco, Santigo Cruz and Lourdes Stephen — presented Best Tropical Song
 Paloma San Basilio — presented Album of the Year

References

External links
 Latin Academy of Recording Arts & Sciences
 11th Latin Grammy Awards: https://web.archive.org/web/20100413135803/http://www.latingrammy.com/en/pages/16-mensage-del-presidente
 Univision site: http://www.univision.com/content/channel.jhtml;?chid=10383&schid=11335

2010 music awards
Latin Grammy Awards by year
2010 in Latin music
2010 in Nevada
Annual Latin Grammy Awards